Mielno  is a settlement in the administrative district of Gmina Zabór, within Zielona Góra County, Lubusz Voivodeship, in western Poland.

The settlement has a population of 22.

References

Villages in Zielona Góra County